The dolichos or dolichus (Greek: , English translation: "long race") in the ancient Olympic Games was a long race ( 4800 m) introduced in 720 BC. Separate accounts of the race present conflicting evidence as to the actual length of the dolichos. However, the average stated length of the race was approximately 12.5 laps, or about three miles. The event was run similarly to modern marathons (the runners would begin and end their event in the stadium proper), but the race course would wind its way through the Olympic grounds. The course would often flank important shrines and statues in the sanctuary, passing by the Nike statue by the temple of Zeus before returning to the stadium.

Dolichos on coinage

Dolichos events have been selected as a main motif in numerous collectors' coins. One of the recent samples is the €10 Greek relays commemorative coin, minted in 2003 to commemorate the 2004 Summer Olympics. In the obverse of the coin three modern athletes run, holding their batons while in the background three ancient athletes are shown running a dolichos.

Winners
 Acanthus of Sparta 720 BC
 Ergoteles of Himera 472 BC
 Ladas of Argos 460 BC
 Aristeus of Argos 420 BC
 Sotades of Crete 384 BC
 Malacus of Macedonia 329 BC
 Aegeus of Argos 328 BC
 Polites of Ceramus 69 AD

See also
 Ancient Greek units of measurement

References

Sources
 Golden, Mark. Sport in the Ancient World from A to Z. Routledge, 2003. 
 Miller, Stephen G. Ancient Greek Athletics: the events at Olympia, Delphi, Nemea, and Isthmia. Yale University Press, 2004. 

Ancient Olympic sports
Long-distance running competitions
Ancient Greek units of measurement
 Extinct sports